The 2004 Colgate Raiders football team was an American football team that represented Colgate University during the 2004 NCAA Division I-AA football season. A year after advancing to the national championship, Colgate tied for third in the Patriot League. 

In its ninth season under head coach Dick Biddle, the team compiled a 7–4 record. Chris Brown, Luke Graham and Antrell Tyson were the team captains. 

The Raiders outscored opponents 261 to 225. Their 4–2 conference record tied for third in the seven-team Patriot League standings.  

Following their deep playoff run in 2003, the Raiders were ranked No. 5 in the preseason national Division I-AA poll. Losses quickly dropped Colgate to the bottom half of the top 25, and a league loss to unranked Bucknell in the second-to-last weekend of the season booted the Raiders from the rankings altogether. Colgate finished the year unranked.

The team played its home games at Andy Kerr Stadium in Hamilton, New York.

Schedule

References

Colgate
Colgate Raiders football seasons
Colgate Raiders football